Dark Angel, in comics, may refer to:

Dark Angel (DC Comics), a villain who battled Wonder Woman
Dark Angel (Marvel Comics), a heroine from the Marvel UK imprint
Dark Angel (Shadow-X), an alternate version of Warren Worthington III, part of the Shadow-X team
Dark Angel (manga), by manga artist Kia Asamiya, tells the stories of turmoil between four gods warrior, in far future Earth.

See also
Dark Angel (disambiguation)